Maia Sandu (born 24 May 1972) is a Moldovan politician who has been the President of Moldova since 24 December 2020. She is the former leader of the Party of Action and Solidarity (PAS) and former Prime Minister of Moldova from 8 June 2019 until 14 November 2019. On 12 November 2019, Sandu's government collapsed after a vote of no-confidence, with 63 (deputies from PSRM and PDM) of the 101 MPs having voted on the motion submitted by the PSRM. Sandu was Minister of Education from 2012 to 2015 and member of the Parliament of Moldova from 2014 to 2015, and again in 2019.

She was selected as the joint candidate of the pro-European PPDA and PAS parties for president of Moldova in the 2016 election. However, she was defeated in the subsequent runoff by the pro-Russian PSRM candidate, Igor Dodon, losing the popular vote by a margin of 48% to 52%. In a rematch between Dodon and Sandu in the 2020 election, she won the subsequent runoff, 58% to 42%, defeating Dodon. She is the first female president of Moldova.

Early life and professional career

Sandu was born on 24 May 1972 in the commune of Risipeni, located in the Fălești District in the Moldavian Soviet Socialist Republic of what was then the Soviet Union. Her parents were Grigorie and Emilia Sandu, a veterinarian and a teacher, respectively. From 1989 to 1994, she majored in management at the Academy of Economic Studies of Moldova (ASEM). In 2010, she graduated from the John F. Kennedy School of Government at Harvard University. From 2010 to 2012, Sandu worked as Adviser to the executive director at the World Bank in Washington, D.C. Sandu speaks English and Russian in addition to her native Romanian.

Political career

From 2012 to 2015, she served as Minister of Education of Moldova. She was considered on 23 July 2015 by the Liberal Democratic Party as a nominee to be the next Prime Minister of Moldova, succeeding Natalia Gherman and Chiril Gaburici.

A day after being proposed by a renewed pro-European coalition, Sandu set the departure of the Head of the National Bank of Moldova, Dorin Drăguțanu and the State Prosecutor Corneliu Gurin as conditions for her acceptance of the office. Ultimately, Valeriu Streleț was nominated over Sandu by the President of Moldova.

On 23 December 2015 she launched a platform "În /pas/ cu Maia Sandu" ("In step with Maia Sandu") that later became a political party called "Partidul Acțiune și Solidaritate" ("Party of Action and Solidarity").

In 2016, Sandu was the pro-European candidate in the Moldovan presidential election. Running on a pro-EU action platform, she was one of the two candidates that reached the runoff of the election.

According to some polls from 2019, Sandu ranks among the three most trusted politicians in Moldova. The most recent available poll, conducted by Public Opinion Fund, shows that Sandu is the second most trusted political personality, polling at 24%, closely following Igor Dodon, who polls at 26%. Other older polls, however, place her lower, in sixth place.

Controversies 

In September 2016, Sandu instituted proceedings against the State Chancellery, requesting to be presented the shorthand from the Cabinet meeting where the state guarantees for the three bankrupted banks (the Bank of Savings, Unibank and the Banca Socială) had been approved. Prime Minister Pavel Filip published on his Facebook page, the shorthand of the last Cabinet meeting, when the decision on granting the emergency credit for the Banca de Economii was adopted. The shorthand included the speeches of former NBM governor Dorin Drăguțanu, former Prime Minister Chiril Gaburici, and Sandu's own speeches from the time as minister of education. It is mentioned that at the end the decision was voted unanimously. The shorthand was not signed.

Regarding former leader of Romania Ion Antonescu, Sandu said in 2018 that he was "a historical figure about whom we may say both good and bad things". Her statements were sharply criticized by the Jewish Community of Moldova (CERM), who issued an open letter stating: "The lack of sanctions for [...] Holocaust denial and glorification of fascism in Moldovan legislation allows some opinion leaders and political leaders to not be held accountable for such acts, and lets them create their public image by distorting and revising historical facts and fueling inter-ethnic and inter-religious discrimination and hate." Sandu replied to this accusation in later interviews by stating: "I regret that my words about the dictator Ion Antonescu were made an object of interpretation. [...] My attitude towards any criminal regime of the 20th century, whether Nazi or communist, which have millions of lives on their consciences, is well known and unequivocally negative. Ion Antonescu was a war criminal, rightly condemned by the international community for war crimes against Jewish and Roma people."

On 21 February 2019, Sandu and the candidates of the ACUM electoral bloc, both of the national and uninominal constituency, signed a public commitment according to which after the Parliamentary elections of 24 February 2019 they would not make any coalition with the Party of Socialists, Democratic Party and Shor Party, and if this commitment is violated they will resign as MPs. She violated this self-imposed commitment after agreeing to form a coalition government along with the Party of Socialists in early June 2019.

As Prime Minister

In the 2019 parliamentary election, Sandu's PAS, together with its ally, PPDA, led by Andrei Năstase, formed the ACUM Electoral Bloc and secured 26 of the 101 seats in the Parliament of Moldova. On 8 June 2019, Maia Sandu was elected Prime Minister of Moldova in a coalition government with PSRM. On the same day, the Constitutional Court of Moldova declared unconstitutional her designation for this position as well as the appointment of the Government of the Republic of Moldova, which sparked the 2019 constitutional crisis. However, on 15 June 2019, the Constitutional Court revised and repealed its previous decisions, declaring the Sandu Cabinet to have been constitutionally created.

The next day, she called for the restoration of public order, discouraging citizens from attending local rallies. In June 2019, she lifted a March 2017 ban by former Prime Minister Filip of official visits by government officials to Russia. In one of her first interviews to foreign media, she announced her intention to request that the United States Treasury add Vlad Plahotniuc to the Magnitsky List. In August, Sandu asked the State Chancellery to prepare a draft decree declaring 23 August to be the European Day of Remembrance for Victims of Stalinism and Nazism instead of the regular Liberation Day. The decree was opposed by her coalition partner, the PSRM, with Moldova's president and ex-PSRM leader Igor Dodon announcing that he will celebrate the date in the old style, rejecting Sandu's proposal.

Under Maia Sandu, Moldova began taking steps towards the European Union as Sandu herself is pro-E.U. Maia Sandu was ousted as prime minister on 12 November 2019, following a vote of no confidence. She remained as a caretaker of the office until the formation of a new government. However, on 24 December 2020 Maia Sandu took office as state president, after winning a landslide election against the Pro-Russian Igor Dodon, and again on a pro-E.U. and anti-corruption platform. Under Sandu's leadership, Moldova is once more in a position to resume moving forward towards European integration.

2020 presidential campaign

Sandu announced her candidacy for the 2020 presidential election on 18 July, declaring that a joint pro-European candidate would not be needed as there was no risk of there being no pro-European candidates in the second round. Sandu officially launched her campaign on 2 October 2020, holding 2 speeches in Romanian and Russian both promising to fight corruption and poverty, and to reform the criminal justice system, while accusing President Dodon of deliberately hindering the latter. Because no candidate received a majority of votes in the first round, a run-off between Sandu and Dodon was held on 15 November, in which Sandu won with 57.75% of the popular vote.

She was congratulated on her win by senior leaders of the European Union, as well as Presidents Volodymyr Zelenskyy of Ukraine, Kassym-Jomart Tokayev of Kazakhstan, Ilham Aliyev of Azerbaijan, and Klaus Iohannis of Romania. Sandu was also congratulated by President of Russia Vladimir Putin, who had initially endorsed Dodon. In her press conference, she declared that Moldova under her leadership "will secure real balance in the foreign policy, being guided by Moldova's national interests, we will have a pragmatic dialogue with all the countries, including Romania, Ukraine, European nations, Russia and the US".

Presidency (2020–present) 
Sandu was sworn in on 24 December 2020 in the Palace of the Republic. During the ceremony, she appealed for national unity, speaking in Russian, Ukrainian, Gagauz and Bulgarian towards the end of her remarks. Thousands of her supporters greeted her outside the palace chanting slogans like "Maia Sandu and the people!" and "The people love you!" After the ceremony, she met Dodon at the Presidential Palace, for a ceremony in which Dodon officially transferred power to her. That day, she met with acting Prime Minister Ion Chicu.

Domestic policy

Parliament 

On 28 December, she met the parliamentary factions for consultations. On 31 December Sandu named Foreign Minister Aureliu Ciocoi acting prime minister after Chicu refused to stay on in an acting capacity. The ex-president of the country, leader of the Party of Communists Vladimir Voronin and the Leader of Our Party Renato Usatii proposed their candidacies for the post of prime minister. At a briefing following her visit to Ukraine, Sandu also touched upon the appointment of the prime minister, stating that "Neither Voronin nor Usatii are suitable for the role of prime minister. We need a serious government, created following early elections." On 27 January 2021, she nominated Natalia Gavrilița as a candidate for the position of Prime Minister, saying that she has the "task of creating the government team and preparing a government program focused on economic development and cleaning up the institutions of the state of corruption". The very next day, Sandu asked MPs to reject her proposed Prime Minister in order to speed up the process of its dissolution and early elections.

Sandu re-nominated Gavrilița on 11 February. The Constitutional Court of Moldova declared the decree unconstitutional, reasoning that Sandu should have accepted a proposal from 54 MPs (primarily from PSRM) to instead nominate Mariana Durleșteanu, a former Moldovan ambassador to the United Kingdom. Sandu refused the proposal of the Constitutional Court and Parliament, saying, "I have said repeatedly that the only way for Moldova to move forward is to organise new parliamentary elections."

Before the Gavrilița Government could be voted on, some PSRM deputies presented a list signed by PSRM, Pentru Moldova (including the Șor Party) and another 3 unaffiliated MPs for supporting the candidature of Mariana Durleșteanu. Sandu declared afterwards that she would not continue consultations, but would not nominate another candidate for Prime Minister. Two options remained: snap elections or a referendum for Sandu's impeachment. On March 16, she again met with parties in the Parliament for consultations. The PSRM delegation was led by Igor Dodon, the president of the party, but not deputy in the Parliament. In the same time, without Dodon's knowledge, Durleșteanu announced that she was retiring her candidature. After the consultations, Sandu announced that there was no parliamentary majority, and in order to end the political crisis, she named Igor Grosu as Prime Minister.

More political figures, such as Pavel Filip and Andrian Candu claimed that Sandu had reached an agreement with Igor Dodon in order to hold early parliamentary elections. Some political analysts stated that the withdrawal of Durleșteanu was planned in order to get closer to snap elections.

On 25 March, Parliament did not vote for Grosu, and the majority of the deputies left the building. Sandu had consultations with all parliamentary forces on 26 March and 29 March. After the Constitutional Court declared the state of emergency unconstitutional, she dissolved the Parliament and called for early elections on 11 July.

COVID-19 

During the visit of President of Romania Klaus Iohannis, he promised Romania would donate 200,000 doses of the Pfizer–BioNTech COVID-19 vaccine to Moldova. On 16 January, Sandu said that Moldovan authorities would allow residents of Transnistria to be vaccinated with the Russian Sputnik V COVID-19 vaccine.

The first 21,600 doses of the Oxford–AstraZeneca COVID-19 vaccine promised by Romania arrived in Moldova on February 28, with the first administrations on March 2. Moldova became the first country in Europe that received vaccines from the COVAX platform. The first shipment delivered in early March arrived with more than 14,000 doses of Oxford–AstraZeneca vaccine.

Sandu got vaccinated on 7 May with the Oxford–AstraZeneca vaccine after Romania stated its intention to donate thousands of vaccines to Moldova. Sandu had previously stated she would only receive vaccination when it was certain Moldova would have enough vaccines to vaccinate its entire population.

Supreme Security Council 

In mid-January 2021, Sandu announced that the Supreme Security Council would be reorganized. On 21 January 2021, human rights activist Ana Revenco was appointed Secretary of the Supreme Security Council and concurrently adviser to Sandu in the field of defense and national security. Revenco's predecessor in these posts, Defense Minister Victor Gaiciuc, remained a member of the Security Council. The renewed Security Council did not include the Minister of Justice Fadei Nagacevschi, the Governor of Gagauzia Irina Vlah, or the director of the National Centre for Combating Corruption Ruslan Flocha. Nagacevschi, commenting on this situation, said: "I am glad that I was inconvenient". Former President Dodon declared the Supreme Security Council to be a threat to national security. His political opponent, former Prime Minister and leader of the Democratic Party Pavel Filip, was in solidarity with the ex-president, saying that "we are seeing double standards".

Foreign policy

European Union and the West 

She is a supporter of Moldova's European integration, the country's entry into the European Union, as well as the resumption of cooperation with the International Monetary Fund. When she received the president of Romania, she declared that "the Republic will integrate into the European space with the help of Romania". Maia Sandu met EU and Belgian political figures in Brussels in January 2021.

She signed on 19 April 2021 in Strasbourg, France, the Council of Europe Action Plan for the Republic of Moldova 2021–2024, an action plan of the Council of Europe with the aim of reforming Moldova's legislation and state institutions and introducing improvements on the country's democracy, human rights and rule of law.

After the outbreak of the 2022 Russian invasion in Ukraine, Sandu signed on 3 March 2022 the application for EU membership, together with Igor Grosu, the President of Moldovan Parliament and Natalia Gavrilița, the Prime Minister of Moldova. This came on the same day (and for the same reasons) that the country of Georgia also formally began its journey to join the EU when Prime Minister of Georgia Irakli Garibashvili signed Georgia's application for EU membership.

Romania 

Romanian President Klaus Iohannis became the first foreign leader to visit Sandu in Moldova, arriving on 29 December. As part of the Moldovan–Romanian collaboration during the COVID-19 pandemic, Iohannis promised that Romania would aid Moldova with medicines, medical and sanitary protection equipment and 200,000 vaccine units. When going to Paris, in a stopover in Bucharest, she met with the Prime Minister of Romania, Florin Cîțu.

Furthermore, when asked about how she would vote in case there was a referendum on the unification of Romania and Moldova, Sandu replied that she would personally vote "yes".

Ukraine 
In a meeting with Ukrainian Foreign Minister Dmytro Kuleba, she confirmed that a visit to Kyiv in January 2021 would become the first foreign trip she will take as president. During her visit on 12 January, she met with President of Ukraine Volodymyr Zelenskyy, where they agreed to create a Presidential Council to address issues of bilateral relations. She also met with Prime Minister Denys Shmyhal and parliament speaker Dmytro Razumkov. She paid tribute to fallen Ukrainians at the Tomb of the Unknown Soldier and the National Museum of the Holodomor-Genocide.

On 24 February 2022, Moldova announced it was closing its airspace because of the Russian invasion of Ukraine. Shortly after President Sandu condemned the act of war by Russia against Ukraine, saying, "a blatant breach of international law and of Ukrainian sovereignty and territorial integrity." She added that Moldova was ready to accept tens of thousands of people fleeing Ukraine after the Russian attack and vowed to keep the borders open to help, saying, "we will help people who need our help and support." As of March 6 over 100,000 Ukrainian citizens had crossed the border into Moldova.

Russia 

In an interview to the TV8 channel, she declared that she is "ready to go to Russia" to discuss issues "concerning trade, exports, settlement of the Transnistria conflict" and others. She also noted that she intends to visit Kyiv and Brussels before going to Moscow, highlighting her more pro-EU stance. On 11 August 2021, Sandu, alongside other officials, met with Dmitry Kozak, the Deputy Kremlin Chief of Staff, where they agreed to lift all economic barriers between the two nations and look into the removal of ammunition depots from Transnistria.

In 2023, Sandu stated that Moscow had sought to overthrow her country's government, echoing accusations made by Ukraine's president Volodymyr Zelenskyy. Sandu accused Russia of trying to orchestrate violent attacks in Moldova to overthrow the government and institute a government that would be more friendly to Russia and derail the plans to join the European Union.

Transnistria 

Sandu has expressed her view that Operational Group of Russian Forces (OGRF) should withdraw from the breakaway region of Transnistria, saying to RBK TV that, although they guard ammunition depots, "there are no bilateral agreements on the OGRF and on the weapons depots". She also stated that its her position that the "mission should be transformed into an OSCE civilian observer mission".

In September 2021, during an interview at a local television station, Sandu was asked to describe the events that took place in 1992 and lead to the Transnistria War, to which she replied: 
 
She further explained that the Transnistria conflict was an artificial problem created in order to stop Moldova from gaining its independence and that other former Soviet countries experienced the same thing. Sandu also stated that Moldova is looking exclusively for a peaceful and diplomatic solution in the Transnistria conflict.

Asked about her position on opinions which suggest that Moldova should recognise the independence of Transnistria due to the conflict's role in delaying Moldova's EU integration, Sandu replied that she totally disagrees with such opinions.

Electoral results

Parliamentary

Presidential

Honours and awards

Honors 

:
 Order of Work Glory (23 July 2014)
:
 First Class of the Order of Prince Yaroslav the Wise (23 August 2021)
:
 First Class of the Order of Vytautas the Great (6 July 2022)

Awards 

 2020 Award of the Group for Social Dialogue (Romania, 27 January 2021)

References

External links 

 
 În /pas/ cu Maia Sandu 

1972 births
Living people
21st-century Moldovan women politicians
Female heads of state
Harvard Kennedy School alumni
Liberal Democratic Party of Moldova politicians
Moldovan economists
Moldovan Ministers of Education
Moldovan people of Romanian descent
Moldovan MPs 2014–2018
Moldovan MPs 2019–2023
People from Fălești District
Presidents of Moldova
Prime Ministers of Moldova
Women government ministers of Moldova
Women presidents
Women prime ministers
Recipients of the Order of Prince Yaroslav the Wise, 1st class